Kazimierz Rudzki (6 January 1911, in Warsaw, Poland – 2 February 1976, in Warsaw) was a Polish stage and film actor, theatre director.

Studied directing at Państwowy Instytut Sztuki Teatralnej. Actor of Syrena Theatre (also director), National Theatre and Współczesny Theatre. Popular presenter on Polish Radio and Polish Television, compère of satirical theatres (cabarets): Kabaret Szpak, Kabaret Wagabunda, Kabaret Pod Egidą and others. Professor at Państwowa Wyższa Szkoła Teatralna.

Selected filmography
 Eroica (1958)
 Głos z tamtego świata (1962)
 Pierwszy dzień wolności (1964)
 Marysia i Napoleon (1966)
 Jak rozpętałem drugą wojnę światową (1969)
 Nie lubię poniedziałku (1971)

TV series
 Wojna domowa (1965–66)

TV movie
  (1964)

External links
 
 http://www.e-teatr.pl/pl/osoby/2609,karierateatr.html - theatrical work and profile at e-teatr.pl

1911 births
1976 deaths
Male actors from Warsaw
Polish cabaret performers
Polish male film actors
Polish male stage actors
Polish male television actors
Polish theatre directors
Polish radio presenters
Polish television presenters
World War II prisoners of war held by Germany
20th-century Polish male actors
20th-century comedians
Recipients of the State Award Badge (Poland)
Prisoners of Oflag II-C